Tubinsky (Tübä) is a rural locality (a selo) and the administrative centre of Tubinsky Selsoviet, Baymaksky District, Bashkortostan, Russia. The population was 1,228 as of 2010. There are 15 streets.

Geography 
Tubinsky is located 43 km north of Baymak (the district's administrative centre) by road. Mullakayevo is the nearest rural locality.

References 

Rural localities in Baymaksky District